Klas Pontus Arnoldson (27 October 1844 – 20 February 1916) was a Swedish author, journalist, politician, and committed pacifist who received the Nobel Peace Prize in 1908 with Fredrik Bajer. He was a founding member of the Swedish Peace and Arbitration Society and a Member of Parliament in the second Chamber of 1882–1887.

Early life
Arnoldson became the railway  clerk and rose to the post of stationmaster in the year 1871 to 1881. He  left the railways and devoted entirely into politics. In 1881, he was elected to the riksdag, the Swedish parliament.

Works
He attempted to shape the public opinion of both Norway and Sweden in favour of peaceful settlement. He also wrote journalistic pieces such as "Is World Peace Possible?", "Religion in the Light of Research", and "The Hope of the Centuries".

See also
 List of peace activists

References

External links

  including the Nobel Lecture, December 10, 1908 World Referendum
 

1844 births
1916 deaths
Nobel Peace Prize laureates
Swedish humanitarians
Swedish Nobel laureates
Members of the Andra kammaren
Writers from Stockholm
Burials at Norra begravningsplatsen